This is a list of social science fiction writers with their best-known works.

 Iain M. Banks -  The Culture series
 Malorie Blackman - The Noughts & Crosses series
 Octavia E. Butler - Parable of the Sower
 Ray Bradbury - Fahrenheit 451
 Renee Gladman –  The Ravicka series
 Robert A. Heinlein
 Aldous Huxley - Brave New World
 James Howard Kunstler - World Made by Hand
 Ursula K. Le Guin - Hainish Cycle, The Lathe of Heaven, Always Coming Home
 Stanisław Lem
 Doris Lessing - Canopus in Argos
 Lois Lowry - The Giver
 George Orwell - Nineteen Eighty Four
 Robert J. Sawyer - Neanderthal Parallax
 Boris and Arkady Strugatsky
 Yevgeny Zamyatin - We
 Isaac Asimov - Nightfall and The Foundation series
 José Saramago - Blindness
 Janusz A. Zajdel, known as "father" of Polish social science fiction

Social fiction
Social science fiction